James Enderby Bidlack (born February 1, 1961) is a biologist.  He is a professor of biology and CURE-STEM Scholar at the University of Central Oklahoma, president of Metabolism Foundation and vice president of The Genome Registry.  Bidlack has co-written the textbook Introductory Plant Biology over several editions since its ninth edition. He also has been involved with the Repository for Germinal Choice, and appeared in a 2006 documentary about the project.

Early life and education
Born in Minneapolis, Minnesota, James (Jim) Bidlack is the youngest son of Verne C. and Norma L. Bidlack.  His father (Verne C. Bidlack, Jr.) worked on the Manhattan Project during World War II.  Jim Bidlack graduated from Jenkintown High School in 1979. He earned his B.S. in Soil and Crop Science from Purdue University in 1984.  Subsequently, Bidlack completed an M.S. Degree with Charles A. Stutte in Crop Physiology at University of Arkansas in 1986, and then a Ph.D. in Plant Physiology under the direction of Dwayne R. Buxton and Richard M. Shibles at Iowa State University in 1990.  Immediately after completing his degrees, Bidlack became a faculty member at the University of Central Oklahoma.  He teaches introductory biology, plant biology, plant physiology, plant anatomy, and molecular cell physiology.

Career
Bidlack is a professor of biology at the University of Central Oklahoma conducting multi-disciplinary research.
He has worked with the weed control of pigeon pea, and determining the nitrogen content and dry weight of both pigeon pea and chickpea in wheat-legume crop rotation. More recent work has involved measuring the morphology, biomass, and vessel diameter in pigeonpea when being subjected to water stress.  He has also worked in collaboration with researcher Philip M. Silverman to evaluate an active type IV secretion system that makes Escherichia coli sensitive to bile salts.  Bidlack has also co-founded The Genome Registry.

References

External links

21st-century American biologists
University of Central Oklahoma faculty
Living people
1961 births